The Hyundai D engine is a family of 3-cylinder and 4-cylinder diesel engines produced by Hyundai Motor Company under license from VM Motori.

The D-line of engines feature cast iron block and aluminum cylinder head, with belt driven single overhead camshafts operating four valves per cylinder.

The D-Line of engines initially targeted Euro 3 emission compliancy with newer iterations being compliant with Euro 4 emission standard.

1.5 L (D3EA)

Applications
 Hyundai Accent (LC) (2002–2005)
 Hyundai Getz (2002–2005)
 Hyundai Matrix (2001–2005)

2.0 L (D4EA)

Applications
 Hyundai Elantra (XD) (2001–2006)
 Hyundai i30 (FD) (2007–2010)
 Hyundai Santa Fe (2001–2009)
 Hyundai Sonata (NF) (2004–2009)
 Hyundai Tucson (JM) (2004–2009)
 Hyundai Trajet (2002–2006)
 Kia Carens (2002–2009)
 Kia Ceed (ED) (2007–2010)
 Kia Cerato (LD) (2004–2006)
 Kia Magentis (MG) (2006–2010)
 Kia Sportage (JE) (2004–2010)

2.2 L (D4EB)

Applications
 Hyundai Grandeur (TG) (2007–2010)
 Hyundai Santa Fe (CM) (2005–2009)

See also
 List of Hyundai engines

References

D
Diesel engines by model
Straight-four engines